The Imperial state of Iran, the government of Iran during the Pahlavi dynasty, lasted from 1925 to 1979. During that time two monarchs — Reza Shah Pahlavi and his son Mohammad Reza Shah Pahlavi — employed secret police, torture, and executions to stifle political dissent. The Pahlavi dynasty has sometimes been described as a "royal dictatorship", or "one-man rule". 
According to one history of the use of torture by the state in Iran, abuse of prisoners varied at times during the Pahlavi reign.

While the shah's violation of the constitution, "trampling on the fundamental laws" and rights of Iranians, was one of the complaints of revolutionaries, some have suggested the Shah's human rights record fares better than that of the revolutionaries who overthrew him. According to political historian Ervand Abrahamian,
"Whereas less than 100 political prisoners had been executed between 1971 and 1979, more than 7900 were executed between 1981 and 1985. ... the prison system was centralized and drastically expanded ... Prison life was drastically worse under the Islamic Republic than under the Pahlavis. One who survived both writes that four months under warden Asadollah Lajevardi took the toll of four years under SAVAK. In the prison literature of the Pahlavi era, the recurring words had been "boredom" and "monotony." In that of the Islamic Republic, they were "fear," "death," "terror," "horror," and most frequent of all "nightmare" (kabos)."

Reza Shah

The reign of Reza Shah was authoritarian and dictatorial at a time when authoritarian governments and dictatorships were common in the world and standard for the region. 

Free press, workers' rights, and political expression were restricted and limited under Reza Shah. Independent newspapers were often closed down and political parties were banned; as were all trade unions with 150 labor organizers arrested between 1927 and 1932.

Physical force was used against some kinds of prisoners — common criminals, suspected spies, and those accused of plotting regicide. Burglars in particular were subjected to the bastinado (beating the soles of the feet), and the strappado (suspended in the air by means of a rope tied around the victims arms) to "reveal their hidden loot". Suspected spies and assassins were "beaten, deprived of sleep, and subjected to the qapani" (the binding of arms tightly behind the back) which sometimes caused a joint to crack. But for political prisoners  — who were primarily Communists — there was a "conspicuous absence of torture" under Reza Shah's rule. The main form of pressure was solitary confinement and the withholding of "books, newspapers, visitors, food packages, and proper medical care". While often threatened with the qapani, political prisoners "were rarely subjected to it."

Reza Shah's reign was often accused of violating freedom of religion and suppressing pious Muslims. In one notable incident, he violated the sanctity of the Fatima al-Masumeh Shrine to beat a cleric who had accused his wife of immodesty. Reza Shah passed a law requiring everyone (except Shia jurisconsults who had passed a special qualifying examination) to wear Western clothes, and forbid women teachers to come to school with head coverings.
Public mourning observances were restricted to one day, and mosques required to use chairs for mourners to sit on during observances, instead of the mourner's traditional sitting on the floors of mosques.

By the mid-1930s, these decrees, confiscation of clerical land holdings, and other problems had caused intense dissatisfaction among the Shi'a clergy throughout Iran, and after a crowd gathered in support of a cleric at the Mashed shrine denouncing the Shah's innovations, corruption and heavy consumer taxes, troops were called in. Dozens of protestors were killed and hundreds injured.

Following this incident, the Shah went further, banning the chador and ordering all citizens - rich and poor - to bring their wives to public functions without head coverings.

Mohammad Reza Shah

Mohammad Reza became monarch after his father was deposed by the Soviets and British in 1941. Political prisoners (mostly Communists) were released by the occupying powers, and the Shah (Crown Prince at the time) no longer had control of the parliament. But after an attempted assassination of the Shah in 1949, he was able to declare martial law, imprison communists and other opponents, and restrict criticism of the royal family in the press.

Following the pro-Shah coup d'état that overthrew Prime Minister Mohammad Mosaddegh in 1953, the Shah again cracked down on his opponents, and political freedom waned. He outlawed Mosaddegh's political group, the National Front, and arrested most of its leaders. Over 4000 political activists of the Tudeh party were arrested, (including 477 in the armed forces), forty were executed, another 14 died under torture and over 200 were sentenced to life imprisonment.

Following this crackdown, conditions for political prisoners and opponents of the authoritarian government were relatively good for many years. "The bulk of Tudeh prisoners were released," and the remaining prisoners who refused to sign letters of regret were allowed to play ping pong, use a gymnasium, and watch television. 
In the 1960s, the Shah also introduced electoral reforms expanding suffrage to women and the ability to hold office to non-Muslims, as part of a broader series of reforms dubbed the White Revolution. One exception to this relative calm was three days of rioting starting 5 June 1963 after Ayatollah Ruhollah Khomeini—a leading opponent of the White Revolution—was arrested. Troops fired on demonstrators in Jaleh Square "slaughtering not less than 15,000 people" according to Khomeini translator Hamid Algar.

1971-1976
However, in 1971 a guerrilla attack on a gendarmerie post (where three police were killed and two guerrillas freed, known as the "Siahkal incident") sparked "an intense guerrilla struggle" against the government, who responded with harsh countermeasures. Inspired by international Third World anti-imperialist revolutionaries (such as Mao Zedong, Ho Chi Minh, and Che Guevara, among many others), left-wing guerrillas embraced "armed struggle" to overthrow the Shah, and were quite active in the first half of the 1970s. Hundreds of them died in clashes with government forces and dozens of Iranians were executed.  According to Amnesty International, the Shah carried out at least 300 political executions.

According to a senior SAVAK officer, after the Siahkal attack interrogators were sent abroad for `scientific training to prevent unwanted deaths from "brute force".`  Methods of torture included sleep deprivation; extensive solitary confinement; glaring searchlights; standing in one place for hours on end; nail extractions; snakes (favored for use with women); electrical shocks with cattle prods, often into the rectum; cigarette burns; sitting on hot grills; acid dripped into nostrils; near-drownings; mock executions; and an electric chair with a large metal mask to muffle screams.  Prisoners were also humiliated by being raped, urinated on, and forced to stand naked.  However, the torture method of choice remained the traditional bastinado used to beat the soles of the feet.

Torture was used to locate arms caches, safe houses and accomplices of the guerrillas, but another incident in 1971 led to the use of torture of political prisoners for another purpose. In 1971, a prisoner, Parviz Nikkhah, serving a ten-year prison sentence for communist subversion "experienced a genuine change of heart." He "astounded" the public by coming out in full support of the regime, starting a career working for the government Radio-Television Network" explaining how the Shah was a "true revolutionary". So impressed was the regime with this conversion and its impact, it "did not take it long to go one step further and `induce` other `conversions.`"

The nature of this torture was "infinitely worse" than torture for information, which being time sensitive, lost its function and was discontinued after a short period of time.

In 1975 the human rights group Amnesty International — whose membership and international influence grew greatly during the 1970s — issued a report on treatment of political prisoners in Iran that was "extensively covered in the European and American Press".

1976-1977
By 1976, this repression was softened considerably thanks to publicity and scrutiny by "numerous international organizations and foreign newspapers." In 1976, Jimmy Carter was elected President of the United States and he "raised the issue of human rights in Iran as well as in the Soviet Union. Overnight prison conditions changed", and the Shah ordered an end to torture.

Islamic Revolution
During the 1978-79 overthrow of the Pahlavi government, protestors were fired upon by troops and prisoners were executed. The real and imaginary human rights violations contributed directly to the Shah's demise, (although some have argued so did his scruples in not violating human rights more as urged by his generals).

The 1977 deaths of the popular and influential modernist Islamist leader Ali Shariati and the Ayatollah Ruhollah Khomeini's son Mostafa were believed to be assassinations perpetrated by SAVAK by many Iranians.  On September 8, 1978, (Black Friday) troops fired on religious demonstrators in Zhaleh (or Jaleh) Square. The clerical leadership announced that "thousands have been massacred by Zionist troops" (i.e. rumored Israeli troops aiding the Shah), Michel Foucault reported 4000 had been killed, and another European journalist reported that the military left behind "carnage."  Post-revolutionary accounting by Emadeddin Baghi, of the government Foundation of Martyrs and Veterans Affairs, found 88 people killed on Black Friday: 64 (including two females) in Jaleh Square, and 24 (including one woman) in other parts of the capital.

Postmortem
Historians evaluations of Shah's human rights record have been kinder than contemporary accounts. An estimated 380, not 15,000 demonstrators were killed during the June 1963 demonstrations in Iran, some of them armed.  A report commissioned (but not published) by the Martyrs Foundation found the total killed in clashes between demonstrators and the Shah's army/security forces during the fourteen months from October 1977 to February 1979 to be not 60,000 but 2781. In reference to the "60,000" figure, the military historian Spencer C. Tucker notes that "Khomeini's regime grossly overstated the revolution's death toll for propaganda purposes". Tucker explains that the consensus of historians regarding estimated deaths during the Iranian Revolution (from January 1978 to February 1979), numbers between 532 and 2,781. 

Instead of thousands killed by Israeli mercenaries in Jaleh Square on Black Friday, it now appears 84 were killed by troops who were Iranian but from a Kurdish region (speaking Kurdish not Hebrew). According to the historian Abbas Amanat: 
 Tucker writes that 94 were killed on Black Friday, of which 64 were protesters and 30 were government security forces. The Iranologist Richard Foltz, likewise, mentions that 64 protesters died at Jaleh Square.

Johann Beukes, author of Foucault in Iran, 1978–1979, notes that "Foucault seems to have adhered to this exaggerated death count at Djaleh Square, propagated by the revolting masses themselves. Thousands were wounded, but the death toll unlikely accounted to more than hundred casualties".

After the revolution, domestic surveillance and espionage, the use of torture for public recantations was not abolished but expanded. SAVAK was replaced by a "much larger" SAVAMA, (later renamed the Ministry of Intelligence). The political historian Ervand Abrahamian puts the Islamic Republic of Iran in the same "league" as "Stalinist Russia, Maoist China, and [the Inquisition of] early modern Europe", in "their systematic use" of torture to produce public recantations by political prisoners.

Others (such as journalist Hooman Majd) believe fear of the government and security services was much more pervasive under the late Shah's regime, and that the Islamic Republic's intelligence services, "although sometimes as brutal as the Shahs', spend far less effort in policing free political expression", inside private spaces. Whether this leniency is the result of lacking the ability to do what the Shah did is questioned.  According to Akbar Ganji, "notions of democracy and human rights have taken root among the Iranian people" making it "much more difficult for the government to commit crimes." Writing about the reform period during the presidency of Mohammad Khatami Iranian-American academic Arzoo Osanloo notes that, "liberal notions of rights are almost hegemonic in Iran today."  And Majd himself explains the Islamic Republic's relative tolerance by claiming that if Iranian intelligence services "were to arrest anyone who speaks ill of the government in private, they simply couldn't build cells fast enough to hold their prisoners."

See also 
Corruption in the Pahlavi dynasty

References

 
Pahlavi Iran